CKHS may refer to:
 Central Kitsap High School, Silverdale, Washington, United States
 Chembur Karnatak High School, Mumbai, India
 Crozer-Keystone Health System, based in Delaware County, Pennsylvania, United States